Williams Frank Wolski (May 23, 1944 - March 5, 2006) was an American football fullback who played one season for the Atlanta Falcons. He went to college at Notre Dame.

Early life and education
Bill Wolski was born on May 23, 1944, in Muskegon, Michigan, where he attended Muskegon Catholic Central High School.  He went to college at Notre Dame. Wolski did not play football in 1962.  In 1963, he had 70 rushes for 320 yards and two touchdowns,  and three catches for 11 yards.  In 1964, he was Notre Dame's leading rusher; he had 136 rushes for 657 yards and 9 touchdowns. Wolski had eight receptions for 130 yards and two touchdowns.  He had 11 total touchdowns in 1964.  In 1965, he had 103 rush attempts for 452 yards and eight touchdowns, five of which were in one game.  He had one catch for eight yards.

Career statistics

Professional career

Atlanta Falcons
Wolski was drafted in the 1966 AFL Draft (10th round, 87th overall, by the New York Jets) and in the 1966 NFL Draft (5th round, 65th overall, by the Atlanta Falcons). He chose to play for the Atlanta Falcons.  He played in two games for the Falcons.  His only stat was a 21-yard kickoff return.  He had a knee injury the next year and chose to retire.

Personal life and death
For 38 years, Wolski was a real-estate developer. After football, he moved back to Michigan where he raised horses.  He had one son. Wolski died on March 5, 2006, of melanoma.  He was 61 at the time of his death.

References

1944 births
2006 deaths
American football fullbacks
Notre Dame Fighting Irish football players
Atlanta Falcons players
Sportspeople from Muskegon, Michigan
Players of American football from Michigan